Chamari may be,

anything to do with the Chamar caste of India, such as the alleged Chamari language
Chamari Polgampola
Chamari Atapattu